Leavitt Falls is a , multi-tiered waterfall in the Sierra Nevada of Mono County, California. The falls are located on Leavitt Creek, a tributary of the West Walker River, and are formed where the creek drops off the edge of a hanging valley into Leavitt Meadow.

A turnout on Highway 108 provides a view of the falls and meadow. The falls themselves are not accessible by trail, as they are located in a steep narrow box canyon. The waterfall and other nearby features are named for Hiram Leavitt, an early settler in Mono County.

See also
List of waterfalls of California

External links

Leavitt Falls at World of Waterfalls
Leavitt Falls Vista Point at Sierra Nevada Geotourism

Waterfalls of California
Landforms of Mono County, California